Michel Frutschi (6 January 1953 – 3 April 1983) was a Swiss professional Grand Prix motorcycle road racer. He competed in Grand Prix motorcycle racing between 1977 and 1983.

Frutschi's best year was 1979, when he finished in fifth place in the 350cc world championship and second in the Formula 750 championship. In the 1982 500cc world championship, he won the 500cc French Grand Prix. Frutschi was killed while competing in the 1983 500cc French Grand Prix at Le Mans.

References 

1953 births
1983 deaths
Sportspeople from Geneva
Swiss motorcycle racers
350cc World Championship riders
500cc World Championship riders
Motorcycle racers who died while racing
Sport deaths in France